is a train station located in Fushimi-ku, Kyoto, Kyoto Prefecture, Japan.

Lines
Keihan Electric Railway
Keihan Main Line

Surroundings
Meishin Expressway Kyoto-Fukakusa Bus stop (Express Transit bus for Tokyo, Yokohama, Nagano, Niigata, Nagoya, Kanazawa, Toyama, Fukui, Gifu Arrives)

Adjacent stations

References

Railway stations in Kyoto